Jacques Dupont (22 October 1929 – 9 November 2002) was Minister of State for Monaco from 1991 and 1994. He previously served as French ambassador to Israel (1982–1986) and South Africa (1988–1991).

References

1929 births
2002 deaths
Ministers of State of Monaco
Ambassadors of France to Israel
Ambassadors of France to South Africa